WGPL is a neighborhood in southwestern Lexington, Kentucky, United States. Its name is an acronym for the main streets in the neighborhood - Wabash Drive, Goodrich Avenue, Pensacola Drive and Lackawanna Drive. It is located between Rosemont Garden, Southland Drive, Nicholasville Road, and the Norfolk Southern railroad tracks. WGPL is part of a larger neighborhood in Lexington called Pensacola Park, which includes Suburban Court, Rosemont Garden, and Penmoken Park, according to the Fayette County Property Value Administrator.

Neighborhood statistics
 Area: 
 Population: 334
 Population density: 3,839 people per square mile
 Median household income: $54,581

References

External links
 http://www.city-data.com/neighborhood/Wgpl-Lexington-KY.html
 http://www.fayette-pva.com/

Neighborhoods in Lexington, Kentucky